Wally O'Connell OAM (6 April 1923 – 28 June 2017) was an Australian rugby league footballer who played in the 1940s and 1950s, and coached in the 1950s, 1960s and 1970s. He played in ten Tests between 1948 and 1951 as captain on one occasion. Wally's younger brother Barry also played first grade football for Easts and Manly.

Playing career

Eastern Suburbs
An Eastern Suburbs junior, O'Connell's NSWRFL first grade career commenced in 1942 with the Eastern Suburbs club with whom he spent seven seasons and played 80 games. His first representative match was for City New South Wales in 1943. On 18 June 1945 a Sydney rugby league team featuring O'Connell travelled to Newcastle to play against their representative team and were defeated 27–26. He was the Roosters' pivot in their 1945 premiership final victory over Balmain.

With senior representative matches cancelled during WWII O'Connell didn't make his Test debut until 1948 against New Zealand in Sydney. He was selected for the 1948-49 Kangaroo Tour and played in five Tests and 16 minor tour games. His sole appearance as captain of the Kangaroos was in the First Test at Leeds of the 1948 Ashes series.

Manly-Warringah
Having been admitted to the Sydney top-grade competition in 1947 the young Manly-Warringah Sea Eagles in 1949 had suffered three lean seasons and set about to secure the services of O'Connell, then regarded as one of the stars of the Australian game. He spent the 1949 season as captain-coach with Christian Brothers Wollongong. The Manly committee secured O'Connell with a 350-pound offer but his registration for the 1950 season was thwarted when Eastern Suburbs blocked the transfer on residential grounds. The Easts committee were dissatisfied with residential evidence O'Connell was able to table for himself and sought proof that O'Connell's wife had also already made the move to Manly. O'Connell was unable to provide this on-the-spot at the meeting, the transfer was blocked and on principle he chose to sit out the 1950 season thereby also jeopardizing his representative career.

O'Connell played two seasons with Manly as captain-coach leading them to 2nd place on the 1951 competition ladder and to the club's first Grand final appearance. He was unable to play in that match due to a fractured bone in his wrist, so was forced to watch from the sideline as his team lost to Souths by a record grand final margin.

His final international appearance was in the 3rd Test of the 1951 domestic series against France.

Post playing
In retirement O'Connell commenced a media career calling rugby league games for Sydney radio on 2UW. In 1966 he took up the coaching role at Manly and was responsible for promoting the young Illawarra junior and future Immortal Bob Fulton straight into first-grade at age 17.

On Australia Day 2004 O'Connell was awarded the Order of Australia Medal "service to rugby league football, particularly as a player and coach".

O'Connell was Australia's oldest living Test captain up until his death on 28 June 2017, at the age of 94.

References

Footnotes
 Whiticker, Alan (2004) Captaining the Kangaroos, New Holland, Sydney
 Andrews, Malcolm (2006) The ABC of Rugby League Austn B
 Whiticker, Alan / Hudson, Glen (1995) The Encyclopedia of Rugby League Players, Gary Allen Pty Ltd. Sydney

External links
Wally O'Connell at Silvertails.net

1923 births
2017 deaths
Australia national rugby league team captains
Australia national rugby league team players
Australian rugby league coaches
City New South Wales rugby league team players
Manly Warringah Sea Eagles captains
Manly Warringah Sea Eagles coaches
Manly Warringah Sea Eagles players
Recipients of the Medal of the Order of Australia
Rugby league five-eighths
Rugby league players from Sydney
Sportsmen from New South Wales
Sydney Roosters players